El Hadi Fayçal Ouadah (born September 24, 1983 in Blida, Algeria) is an Algerian football player who is currently playing as a goalkeeper for AS Khroub in the Algerian Ligue 2.

Career statistics

Club

References

External links

1983 births
Living people
People from Blida
Algerian footballers
USM Blida players
USM Annaba players
MC Saïda players
Association football goalkeepers
21st-century Algerian people